The Violin Sonata No. 2 of Ludwig van Beethoven in A major, the second of his Opus 12 set (along with his Violin Sonata No. 1 and Violin Sonata No. 3), was written in 1797-8 and dedicated to Antonio Salieri. It has three movements:

Allegro vivace in A major
Andante, più tosto allegretto in A minor
Allegro piacevole

A typical performance lasts approximately 18 minutes.

Media

External links
 
List of works by Beethoven with dates, keys and internal movement keys including for example that for opus 12/2.

Violin Sonata 02
1798 compositions
Compositions in A major
Music dedicated to students or teachers